Pierre Réal (1922 – 13 December 2009) was a French entomologist.
He specialised in Lepidoptera.

He was a professor at the Faculty of Besançon.

Works 
His best known work is the book he wrote with Le Moult on the genus Morpho, published as a supplement to the journal Novitates Entomologicae.

A list of 29 of his works is given by J. C. Robert.

Genera and species he described

1953
 Anoplocnephasia
 Brachycnephasia
 Cnephasia alternella interjunctana
 Cnephasia alternella parvana
 Cnephasia alternella peyerimhoffi
 Cnephasia alternella pseudochrysantheana
 Cnephasia alternella rectilinea
 Cnephasia alternella siennicolor
 Cnephasia alternella vulgaris
 Cnephasia alticola decaryi
 Cnephasia alticola juncta
 Cnephasia bizensis
 Cnephasia canescana griseana
 Cnephasia canescana grisescana
 Cnephasia canescana montserrati
 Cnephasia canescana venansoni
 Cnephasia communana caprionica
 Cnephasia communana lucia
 Cnephasia communana pseudorthoxyana
 Cnephasia communana seminigra
 Cnephasia conspersana albicans
 Cnephasia conspersana gallicana
 Cnephasia conspersana pseudoalternella
 Cnephasia cottiana buvati
 Cnephasia cottiana pyrenaea
 Cnephasia incanana infuscata
 Cnephasia interjecta mediocris
 Cnephasia joannisis dumonti
 Cnephasia legrandi
 Cnephasia longana minor
 Cnephasia obsoletana algerana
 Cnephasia osseana alpicola
 Cnephasia osseana alpicolana
 Cnephasia osseana borreoni
 Cnephasia osseana pratana
 Cnephasia osseana pseudolongana
 Cnephasia osseana solfatarana
 Cnephasia pascuana pseudocommuana
 Cnephasia penziana alpestris
 Cnephasia penziana clarana
 Cnephasia penziana livonica
 Cnephasia sedana mediterranea
 Cnephasia wilkinsoni directana
 Eana cyanescana
 Eana filipjevi
 Eana viardi
1951
 Cnephasia ecullyana
 Cnephasia orthoxyana
 Cnephasia orthoxyana confluentana
 Cnephasia orthoxyana reducta
 Cnephasia orthoxyana styx
 Cnephasia rielana
 Hypostephanuncia
1952
 Cnephasia interjecta confluens
 Cnephasia obsoletana cleuana
 Cnephasia obsoletana pseudotypica
 Cnephasia sedana meridionalis
 Cnephasia wilkinsoni
1988
 Coccidiphila charlierella
 Leptidea lorkovicci, becoming Leptidea reali Reissinger, 1989
 Micopterix liogierella
 Micopterix vallebonella

Species named after him
 Leptidea reali Reissinger, 1989

References

1922 births
2009 deaths
French lepidopterists
20th-century French zoologists